"What's My Mission Now?" is a single by the American industrial hip-hop group Tackhead, released in October 1985 on On-U Sound. Scott Becker of Option called it "Sherwood as his outrageous best: wild stereo effects, a crucial beat, a bit of dubbing-it-up, found vocals (in this instance, used largely to poke fun at the military), odd sounds, the works."

Formats and track listing 
All songs written by Keith LeBlanc, Skip McDonald, Adrian Sherwood and Doug Wimbish
UK 12" single (ON-U DP 13)
"What's My Mission Now?" – 7:30
"Now What?" – 6:38

Personnel 
Keith LeBlanc – drums, percussion
Skip McDonald – guitar
Adrian Sherwood – sampler, programming, producer
Doug Wimbish – bass guitar

Charts

References

External links 
 

1985 songs
1985 singles
On-U Sound Records singles
Song recordings produced by Adrian Sherwood
Tackhead songs
Songs written by Doug Wimbish